Normanhurst is a suburb in the Northern Sydney region, or Upper North Shore of Sydney in the state of New South Wales, Australia, 22 kilometres north-west of the Sydney central business district in the local government area of Hornsby Shire.

History
Normanhurst was originally known as Hornsby, with the suburb that is now known as Hornsby called Jack's Island. 

The land on which Normanhurst stands was granted to Constable Horne, who along with Constable John Thorn, captured bushrangers Dalton and John MacNamara, leader of the North Rocks gang on 22 June 1830. Constable Horne's land became what is now known as Normanhurst and Constable Thorn's land became the neighbouring suburb of Thornleigh.

The construction of the Main Northern and North Shore railway lines in the 1890s brought about a name change. The two lines were joined at a station called Hornsby Junction, whereas the station one stop south on the Northern line kept the name Hornsby. Due to confusion around the similarly named stops, the postmaster demanded that Hornsby station change its name.

The railway station originally known as 'Hornsby', opened on 21 November 1895  and the name was changed by the local community to Normanhurst in 1900.

The first Hornsby Post Office opened on 1 August 1864 and was renamed South Hornsby in 1900 and Normanhurst in 1905.

Normanhurst was derived from the name of a prominent resident, civil engineer Norman Selfe (1839–1911), with hurst being the English word for a wooded hill. Selfe protested against the name change, preferring the name St Normans, which he suggested would have been "more elegant and suggestive". The railway station was renamed in 1900 and was used for the suburb that developed around it.

Heritage listings 
Normanhurst has one heritage-listed site, including:
 82-84 Pennant Hills Road: Gilligaloola

Geography
Normanhurst is divided by Pennant Hills Road, a major north-south road that leads north to the M1 Motorway, and south towards Parramatta. However, both the east and west sections have extensive bush access. On the east side, a small section of bush lies between Normanhurst and Fox Valley. This is land occupied by the SAN Hospital. On the western side, the suburb backs onto the southern reaches of the Berowra Valley, a continuous section of bush stretching all the way to Broken Bay. This gives Normanhurst a very "leafy" and rural look. This in turn contributes to making native bird life abundant. The area is home to cockatoos, rainbow lorikeets, kookaburras, noisy miners, native brush turkeys, and powerful owls. Additionally, Normanhurst has several small waterfalls, which promote reptile and marsupial life, such as Eastern grey kangaroos, echidnas and red-bellied black snakes. It also has encouraged the growth of retirement residences in the suburb. The Hornsby Shire Historical Society and Museum is located on Kenley Road.

Commercial area

Normanhurst has a small number of shops close to Normanhurst railway station, which includes cafes, restaurants and an Australia Post office.

Transport
Normanhurst is serviced by rail and buses. Normanhurst railway station is on the Northern Line of the Sydney Trains network. Transdev NSW's Upper North Shore service provide bus services to the area.

At the 2016 census, only 31% of employed people travelled to work on public transport and 53.1% by car (either as driver or as passenger).
Pennant Hills Road is a major highway in Sydney.

Demographics 

At the 2016 census, the suburb of Normanhurst recorded a population of 5,290.5.

Age and sex distribution Children aged 15 and under made up 20.3% of the population, compared to the national average of 18.7%. Residents aged 65 and over made up 18% of the total population (national average was 15.8%). 47.9% of residents were male and 52.1% were female.

 Ethnic and cultural diversity  Almost two-thirds of the population (65%) were born in Australia. The next most common countries of birth were China 5.3%, England 4.4% and India 3.3%. Only 22.1% of the population identified their ancestry as Australian, 24% English, 7.8% Chinese, 7.7% Irish and 7.1% Scottish. The most commonly spoken language at home other than English includes Mandarin 6.1%, Cantonese 2.6%, and Korean 1.8%.

 Finances and housing  The median weekly household income was $2,140, higher than the national average of $1,438. The real estate was correspondingly high with median monthly mortgage repayments at $2,600. 

 Religion  The most common responses for religion in Normanhurst in the 2016 Census were No Religion 26.9%, Catholic 26.3%, Anglican 16.9%, and Uniting Church 5.4%.

Schools

Secondary Schools

 Loreto Normanhurst (Private, girls only)

 Normanhurst Boys' High School (Public, selective, boys only)

Primary Schools

Normanhurst Public School (Public)

Normanhurst West Public School (which is actually in Thornleigh).

Churches
St. Stephen's Anglican Church
Queen of Peace Catholic Church 
Normanhurst Uniting Church
The Church of Jesus Christ of Latter-day Saints

Sport and recreation
Normanhurst Sports Club 
 Normanhurst is home to the Normanhurst Eagles Football Club, their home ground is Normanhurst Oval. The club caters for both male and female football players in junior and senior divisions. The club's flagship team currently play in the Gladesville Hornsby Football Association's top-tier Premier League competition.
 Normanhurst-Warrawee Cricket Club also plays in Normanhurst, and is one of the most successful clubs in the Hornsby Ku-Ring-Gai Hills District Cricket Association, and has made several junior statewide twenty20 finals. The club's home ground is Normanhurst Park, as is its clubroom.

References

External links
  [CC-By-SA]

Suburbs of Sydney
Hornsby Shire